Salem Creek is a stream in St. Francois and Ste. Genevieve Counties in the U.S. state of Missouri. It is a tributary of Terre Bleue Creek.

Salem Creek takes its name from a nearby Methodist church of the same name.

See also
List of rivers of Missouri

References

Rivers of St. Francois County, Missouri
Rivers of Ste. Genevieve County, Missouri
Rivers of Missouri